Cyperus grandifolius is a species of sedge that is native to parts of the Galápagos Islands.

See also
List of Cyperus species

References

grandifolius
Plants described in 1855
Flora of the Galápagos Islands